Old Ground is an album released by Seven Nations, at that time known as Clan na Gael, in 1995.

Track listing
Colonel Fraser/The Big Parcel/Elzik's Farewell (3:34)
No Reason (4:06)
The Pound a Week Rise (4:42)
Scream (4:47)
Trumpan/Clare Jig/The Gaitha/Fiddlehead (6:22)
God (4:10)
Canadee-i-o (7:14)
Campbell's Farewell to Redcastle/Christo Wraps the Reichstag/The Kilt is My Delight/Maggie's Pancakes (5:05)
Green (4:14)
Ye Jacobites by Name/The Rights of Man (4:23)
Men of Argyll/Old Ground (5:10)

Seven Nations (band) albums
1995 albums